The Hopman Cup XXIV (also known as the Hyundai Hopman Cup for sponsorship reasons) corresponds to the 24th edition of the Hopman Cup tournament between nations in men's and women's tennis. The tournament commenced on 31 December 2011 at the Burswood Dome in Perth, Western Australia.

Eight teams competed for the title, with two round robin groups of four, from which the top team of each group progressed to the final.

United States were the 2011 champions. In that tournament's final the United States of America team of Bethanie Mattek-Sands and John Isner defeated Belgium's Justine Henin and Ruben Bemelmans 2–1. This was the USA's sixth Hopman Cup title.

Czech Republic won their second title, defeating France in the final 2–0.

Tournament
The 2012 Hyundai Hopman Cup was an invitational tennis tournament and is also known as the Official Mixed Teams Championships of the ITF. The 2012 cup had prize money of $1 million and followed the traditional round robin format, the leading teams after three round robin matches qualified for the final. All matches were best of three sets with the exception of the doubles match where a match tie break, first to ten points, was played if the match was tied at one set all. All ties were played in this format; women's singles, men's singles and finally mixed doubles. In the event of a tie in the final group standings the following will be used to separate the nations; 
 The highest total of matches won
 Best percentage of sets won and lost
 Best percentage of games won and lost
 Head-to-head performances
 Toss of a coin

Entrants

Seeds
The seeds for the 2012 Hopman Cup were decided by tournament director Paul McNamee, Rob Casey and Geoff Masters.

 ' – Petra Kvitová / Tomáš Berdych (champions)
  – Marion Bartoli / Richard Gasquet (finalists)  – Anabel Medina Garrigues / Fernando Verdasco (round robin)  – Bethanie Mattek-Sands / Mardy Fish (round robin)Other entrants

  – Caroline Wozniacki / Frederik Nielsen (round robin)  – Jarmila Gajdošová / Lleyton Hewitt (round robin)  – Tsvetana Pironkova / Grigor Dimitrov (round robin)  – Li Na / Wu Di (round robin)Group stage

Group AAll times are local (UTC+8).Standings

Czech Republic vs. Bulgaria

USA vs. Denmark

Denmark vs. Bulgaria

Czech Republic vs. USA

Czech Republic vs. Denmark

USA vs. Bulgaria

Group BAll times are local (UTC+8).''

Standings

France vs. China

Australia vs. Spain

Spain vs. China

Australia vs. France

France vs. Spain

Australia vs. China

Final

Czech Republic vs. France

References

External links

Hopman Cup
Hopman Cups by year
Hopman Cup
Hopman Cup
Hopman Cup